Dear Father is a 1979 Italian drama film directed by Dino Risi. It was entered into the 1979 Cannes Film Festival, where Stefano Madia won the award for Best Supporting Actor.

Cast
 Vittorio Gassman - Albino Millozza
 Andrée Lachapelle - Giulia Millozza
 Aurore Clément - Margot
 Stefano Madia - Marco Millozza
 Julien Guiomar - Parrella
 Joanne Côté - Laura
 Antonio Maimone - Enrico
 Andrew Lord Miller - James
 Piero Del Papa - Duilio
 Mario Verdon - Ugo
 Don Arrès - Marco
 Gérard Arthur - Rodolfo
 Sergio Ciulli - Gianni
 Clara Colosimo - Myrta
 Nguyen Duong Don - Pierre

References

External links

1979 films
1979 drama films
Italian drama films
1970s Italian-language films
Films about terrorism in Europe
Films directed by Dino Risi
Films scored by Manuel De Sica
1970s Italian films